Barghban (also Romanized as Barqebān, Barqebān, Barghebān, and Barqbān; also known as Bargheyān, Barghīān, Barqabeh, Borghbeh, Tabailak, and Varqabeh) is a village in Tabas Rural District, in the Central District of Khoshab County, Razavi Khorasan Province, Iran. At the 2006 census, its population was 1,115, in 295 families.

References 

Populated places in Khoshab County